The following lists events that happened during 1902 in Chile.

Incumbents
President of Chile: Germán Riesco

Events 
28 May – The Pacts of May are signed. 
20 November – The Cordillera of the Andes Boundary Case 1902 (Argentina, Chile) is settled.

Births
2 February – Roberto Cortés (d. 1975)
10 February – Guillermo Riveros (d. 1959)
24 February – Carlos Vidal (d. 1982)
28 February – Marcela Paz (d. 1985)
21 June – Carlos Schneeberger (d. 1973)
12 July – Bernardo Ibáñez (d. 1983)
29 July – David Arellano (d. 1902)
6 October – Roberto Müller

Deaths 
1 February – Aníbal Zañartu (b. 1847)
26 July – Recaredo Santos Tornero (b. 1842)

References 

 
Years of the 20th century in Chile
Chile